This is a list of Georgia covered bridges. There are 16 wooden covered bridges in the U.S. state of Georgia.

Existing covered bridges
The following is a list of the 16 extant Georgia covered bridges.
  

 Sorting this column will result in bridges being listed in order by county.

See also

List of bridges on the National Register of Historic Places in Georgia
World Guide to Covered Bridges

References

 North Georgia's Covered Bridges
 Historic Covered Bridges of Georgia
 Discover Georgia's Quaint Covered Bridges

External links

 Coheelee Creek Covered Bridge historical marker
 Poole's Mill Covered Bridge historical marker
 Cromer's Mill Covered Bridge historical marker
 Hurricane Shoals Covered Bridge historical marker

Georgia
Bridges
Bridges